Bear Swamp is a park and open space reserve in Ashfield, Massachusetts. 

Bear Swamp may also refer to the following:

Bear Swamp, Florida, part of the Ocala National Forest, in Florida
Bear Swamp, New Jersey, an old growth forest in Cumberland County, New Jersey
Bear Swamp, Sussex County, New Jersey, feeds Lake Owassa and Culvers Lake, in Sussex County, New Jersey (now a Wildlife Management Area, including the Culvermere property and former Beardall properties).
Bear Swamp Hydroelectric Power Station, located in Massachusetts near the Deerfield River
Bear Swamp Preserve, a national natural landmark in Westerlo, New York